Elections to Larne Borough Council were held on 21 May 1997 on the same day as the other Northern Irish local government elections. The election used three district electoral areas to elect a total of 15 councillors.

Election results

Note: "Votes" are the first preference votes.

Districts summary

|- class="unsortable" align="centre"
!rowspan=2 align="left"|Ward
! % 
!Cllrs
! % 
!Cllrs
! %
!Cllrs
! %
!Cllrs
! % 
!Cllrs
!rowspan=2|TotalCllrs
|- class="unsortable" align="center"
!colspan=2 bgcolor="" | UUP
!colspan=2 bgcolor="" | DUP
!colspan=2 bgcolor="" | Alliance
!colspan=2 bgcolor="" | SDLP
!colspan=2 bgcolor="white"| Others
|-
|align="left"|Coast Road
|bgcolor="40BFF5"|32.4
|bgcolor="40BFF5"|2
|25.4
|1
|10.3
|0
|13.3
|1
|18.6
|1
|5
|-
|align="left"|Larne Lough
|bgcolor="40BFF5"|55.4
|bgcolor="40BFF5"|3
|25.3
|1
|15.8
|1
|0.0
|0
|3.5
|0
|5
|-
|align="left"|Larne Town
|20.9
|1
|22.9
|1
|10.2
|0
|0.0
|0
|bgcolor="#DDDDDD"|46.0
|bgcolor="#DDDDDD"|3
|5
|-
|- class="unsortable" class="sortbottom" style="background:#C9C9C9"
|align="left"| Total
|36.4
|6
|24.5
|3
|12.2
|1
|4.2
|2
|22.7
|4
|15
|-
|}

Districts results

Coast Road

1993: 2 x UUP, 1 x DUP, 1 x Alliance, 1 x Independent Nationalist
1997: 2 x UUP, 1 x DUP, 1 x SDLP, 1 x Independent Nationalist
1993-1997 Change: SDLP gain from Alliance

Larne Lough

1993: 3 x UUP, 2 x DUP
1997: 3 x DUP, 1 x UUP, 1 x Alliance
1993-1997 Change: Alliance gain from DUP

Larne Town

1993: 2 x UUP, 1 x UUP, 1 x Alliance, 1 x Independent Unionist
1997: 2 x Independent, 1 x DUP, 1 x UUP, 1 x Independent Unionist
1993-1997 Change: Independent (two seats) gain from UUP and Alliance

References

Larne Borough Council elections
Larne